The women's 80 metres hurdles at the 1950 European Athletics Championships was held in Brussels, Belgium, at Heysel Stadium on 25 and 26 August 1950.

Medalists

Results

Final
26 August
Wind: 0.9 m/s

Heats
25 August

Heat 1
Wind: 0 m/s

Heat 2
Wind: -0.1 m/s

Heat 3
Wind: -0.3 m/s

Participation
According to an unofficial count, 15 athletes from 8 countries participated in the event.

 (1)
 (1)
 (3)
 (1)
 (3)
 (2)
 (1)
 (3)

References

80 metres hurdles
Sprint hurdles at the European Athletics Championships